The 'Astana' Presidential Club is a multi-sports club established under the initiative of Nursultan Nazarbayev in 2012. The main aim of the Club is to support and develop professional sports and sports of high achievement in Kazakhstan and promote the image of Astana and Kazakhstan in general, on the international arena.

Members

Present Teams
Astana Arlans - an amateur boxing team, competes in the World Series of Boxing tournament. They are champion of 2012–13 WSB season.
Astana Pro Team - a professional road bicycle racing team, competes in the UCI World Tour.
Barys Astana - an ice hockey team, plays in the Kontinental Hockey League (KHL).
FC Astana - a professional football team, plays in the Kazakhstan Premier League.  The first Kazakh club to participate in the knockout phase of a UEFA club competition
BC Astana - a basketball team, plays in the VTB United League.

Past Teams
Astana Dakar Team - a rally raid team, competed in the Dakar Rally.
Astana Water Polo Club - a professional water polo team, competes in the National Water Polo Championship.

Past Individual members
Denis Ten - was a figure skater. He was the 2014 Olympic bronze medalist, the 2013 World silver medalist and the 2011 Asian Winter Games champion. 
Ilya Ilyin - is a weightlifter. Ilyin has won two Asian and Olympic championships and three world championships. He is currently the world and Olympic record holder in both the clean and jerk (233 kg) and the overall total (418 kg) in the 94 kg class. He is Kazakhstan's first two-time Olympic champion.

References

External links
  

 
Multi-sport clubs in Kazakhstan
Sport in Astana
Water polo clubs in Kazakhstan